Poetry for Young People: Langston Hughes is a 2006 children's poetry collection by Langston Hughes edited by David Roessel and Arnold Rampersad and illustrated by Benny Andrews, originally published by Sterling Publishing Company.

Synopsis 
Selected poems of African American poet Langston Hughes are compiled accompanied by illustrations representing elements of the poems.

Background and development 
Rampersad is the author of a two volume biography of Langston Hughes. Roessel has also shown interest in Hughes' life and co-edited other collections of Hughes poetry.

Reception 
The book received an honor award for the 2007 Coretta Scott King Award for illustration.

References 

2006 children's books
2006 poetry books
Poetry by Langston Hughes
Children's poetry books
American poetry collections
Sterling Publishing books